Waiting for the Sun is the third studio album by the American rock band the Doors. The album's 11 tracks were recorded between January and May 1968 at TTG Studios in Los Angeles. Released by Elektra Records on July 3, 1968, it became the band's only number one album (topping the charts for four weeks), while also included their second US number one single, "Hello, I Love You" (for two weeks starting August 3, 1968). The first single released off the record was "The Unknown Soldier," which peaked at number 39 on the Billboard Hot 100. It also became the band's first hit album in the UK, where it reached number 16.

Having released two records which drew from a large pool of previously composed songs, the Doors started to improvise for this third LP in late 1967. Due to the shortage of original material, the group suffered what drummer John Densmore described as the "third album syndrome", meaning the difficulty of a band to have a stock of good compositions, capable of filling a third disc in a row. The recording sessions also proved difficult for the group due to lead singer Jim Morrison's worsening alcoholism.

The album provoked mixed reactions upon release and in subsequent decades, with critics commenting on the widely varying musical styles and songwriting quality as detriments and inconsistent. However, it has also attracted some more sympathetic appraisal for its mellower sound and experimentation with other genres. To coincide with the 50th anniversary of the album's release in 2018, a 1-LP/2-CD deluxe version of the album was released by Rhino Records. This was overseen by long-time Doors sound engineer Bruce Botnick.

Background and recording
The Doors started recording Waiting for the Sun in January 1968 at Sunset Sound Studios, with early versions of "The Unknown Soldier" and "Spanish Caravan". The group soon moved at TTG Studios in Hollywood, California, where the majority of the album's recording took place; the same time Frank Zappa was recording.  The band had used up most of frontman Jim Morrison's original songbook, a collection of lyrics and ideas, for their first two records. Consequently, following months of touring, interviews and television appearances, they had little new material. The band attempted to record a longer piece called "Celebration of the Lizard" and intended the piece to occupy the second side of the album; this was later shelved. However, a recording of the "Not to Touch the Earth" segment was included and the full lyrics to "Celebration of the Lizard" were printed inside the album's gatefold sleeve.

Many of the album tracks were created in the studio, with some, such as "Hello, I Love You", being older songs not recorded for their earlier albums. The production by Paul A. Rothchild led to multiple takes as a result of his growing perfectionism, which was becoming an issue for the group. Morrison's increasing alcohol consumption also caused tension and difficulties in the studio, and at one point drummer John Densmore walked out of a session frustrated at his behavior. Alice Cooper was around during the recording sessions and he was reportedly worried about Morrison's health. During the recording of "Five to One", Morrison was in intense state of intoxication, to a degree that the studio's assistants needed to support him to complete his vocal parts. Each song on the album required overall at least 20 takes with "The Unknown Soldier", recorded in two parts, requiring 130 takes.

Composition
Waiting for the Sun includes the band's second chart topper, "Hello, I Love You," one of the last remaining songs from Morrison's 1965 batch of tunes. It had been demoed by the group for Aura Records in 1965 before guitarist Robby Krieger had joined the group, as had "Summer's Almost Gone." In the liner notes to The Doors: Box Set, Krieger denied the allegations that the song's main riff and vocal melody were stolen from Ray Davies, with a similar riff having been featured in the Kinks' "All Day and All of the Night." Instead, he said the song's vibe was taken from Cream's song "Sunshine of Your Love." It has been suggested the courts in the UK determined in favor of Davies and any royalties for the song were paid to him.

Waiting for the Sun contains two songs with military themes: "Five to One" and "The Unknown Soldier". Journalists Nathan Brackett and Christian Hoard speculate that "Five to One" seems to be revolutionary propulsive, spouted by the "hippie/ flower child" hordes Morrison saw in growing numbers. Regardless of this interpretation, Morrison confirmed that the lyrics were not political. The lines "Night is drawing near/ Shadows of the evening/ crawl across the years" may have been lifted by Morrison from the 19th-century hymnal and bedtime rhyme "Now the Day is Over" ("Now the day is over/ Night is drawing nigh/ Shadows of the evening/ Steal across the sky").

"The Unknown Soldier" exemplified the group's cinematic approach to their music. In the beginning, as well as after the middle of the song, the mysterious sounds of the organ are heard, depicting the mystery of the "Unknown Soldier." In the middle of the song, the Doors produced, with the assistance of Crawdaddy! magazine critic Paul Williams, the sounds of a marching cadence. It begins with military drums, plus the sound of the sergeant counting off in 4s ("HUP, HUP, HUP, 2, 3, 4"), until he says "COMPANY! HALT! PRESENT! ARMS!", followed by the sounds of loading rifles and a long military drum roll, a pause and then rifle shots. After this middle section, the verses return, with Morrison, singing in a sadder tone to "make a grave for the Unknown Soldier," with a mysterious organ being heard. The song ends with Morrison's ecstatic celebration of a war being over, with sounds of crowds cheering and bells tolling. The lyrics are viewed as Morrison's reaction to the Vietnam War and the way that conflict was portrayed in American media at the time, with lines such as "Breakfast where the news is read/ Television children fed/ Unborn living, living dead/ Bullets strike the helmet's head" reflecting how news of the war was being presented in the living rooms of ordinary people. The band also shot a promotional film for the song. 

The centerpiece of the album was supposed to be the lengthy theatrical piece "Celebration of the Lizard", but in the end only the "Not to Touch the Earth" section was used. In a 1969 interview with Jerry Hopkins for Rolling Stone, Morrison said of the epic, "It was pieced together on different occasions out of already existing elements rather than having any generative core from which it grew. I still think there's hope for it." At the conclusion of "Not to Touch the Earth", Morrison utters his iconic personal maxim, "I am the Lizard King/ I can do anything." The opening lines of the song, "Not to touch the earth/ not to see the sun" were taken from the table of contents of The Golden Bough. Krieger's skills with the flamenco guitar can be found on "Spanish Caravan", with Granainas intro and a reworking of the melody from the classical piece Asturias (Leyenda) composed by Isaac Albéniz.
The optimistic "We Could Be So Good Together" had been recorded during the sessions for Strange Days, even appearing on an early track listing. A review in Slant Magazine described the song as "categorically pre-fame Morrison," pointing out that the line "The time you wait subtracts from joy" is the kind of hippie idealism the singer had long abandoned. It was issued as the B-side of the single "The Unknown Soldier" which peaked at number 39 on the Billboard Hot 100 chart. The single version quotes the opening theme from Thelonious Monk's "Straight, No Chaser."

The track "Wintertime Love" and the mournful "Summer's Almost Gone" address seasonal themes, while the gentle "Yes, the River Knows" was written by Krieger. In the liner notes to the 1997 Doors retrospective Box Set, Manzarek praises the latter: "The piano and guitar interplay is absolutely beautiful. I don't think Robby and I ever played so sensitively together. It was the closest we ever came to  being Bill Evans and Jim Hall." In the same essay, Manzarek refers to "Summer's Almost Gone" as "a cool Latino-Bolero kind of thing with a Bach-like bridge. It's about the ephemeral nature of life. A season of joy and light and laughter is coming to an end." While recording "My Wild Love", the band eventually gave up on the music and turned it into a work song by getting everyone in the studio to clap their hands, stamp their feet and chant in unison. Robby Krieger has cited "My Wild Love" as his least favorite Doors song, recalling that when a bodyguard said to him that his most-liked tune of the band is "My Wild Love", Krieger responded: "Oh shit, man, I hate that song". Morrison wrote "Love Street" for his girlfriend Pamela Courson and like all of his other songs about or dedicated to her, there was a hesitancy or biting refusal at the end ("I guess I like it fine, so far").

Releases
Waiting for the Sun was released on July 3, 1968, although some sources incorrectly noted on 12 July. The album has sold over 7 million copies since its 1968 original release (as noted in 2015). Although "Celebration of the Lizard" was not included on the original release of the album, a recording of the long piece was later included along with two early takes of "Not to Touch the Earth" as bonus tracks on the 40th anniversary expanded edition release of the album (subtitled "An Experiment/Work in Progress").

Reissues
In 1988, Waiting for the Sun was digitally remastered by Bruce Botnick and Paul A. Rothchild at Digital Magnetics using the original master tapes. DCC Compact Classics reissued the album on 24kt gold CD in 1993 and on 180g vinyl in 1998, both versions were mastered by Steve Hoffman. It was remastered again in 1999 by Bernie Grundman and Bruce Botnick at Bernie Grundman Mastering for The Complete Studio Recordings box set, using 96khz/24bit technology; it was also released as a standalone CD release. In 2006 the album was reissued on a CD/DVD set featuring both stereo and 5.1 remixes created by Botnick for the Perception box set. The 2006 stereo remix was also released on a standalone CD release in 2007 including five bonus tracks, which was mastered by Botnick at Uniteye. In 2009, it was reissued on 180g vinyl featuring the original mix; this edition was cut by Bernie Grundman. Analogue Productions also reissued the album on SACD and double 45 RPM vinyl, both editions were mastered by Doug Sax and Sangwook Nam at the Mastering Lab; the CD layer of the Super Audio CD contains the original stereo mix while the SACD layer contains Botnick's 2006 5.1 surround mix.

In 2018, Rhino Records released a 1-LP/2-CD deluxe edition to commemorate the album's 50th anniversary release, which was remastered by Botnick utilizing the Plangent Process. The CDs are encoded with MQA technology. The LP and first CD feature remastered versions of the same 11 tracks from the original 1968 release. The second CD features 14 previously unreleased tracks. The 50th anniversary edition omits the bonus tracks featured on the 40th anniversary edition and also features rough mixes of all the album's tracks. Botnick recommended some of these versions, saying, "I prefer some of these mixes as they represent all of the elements and additional background vocals and some intangible roughness, all quite attractive and refreshing."

Critical reception

Despite its commercial success, Waiting for the Sun polarised critics and many derided it as pretentious and over-arranged. Journalist Mikal Gilmore noted that many criticisms were centered to the "transparent commercial appeal" of the album's opener "Hello, I Love You", with The Rolling Stone Album Guide dismissing it as a "jagged Kinks ripoff on which Morrison comes out like a rapist..." Jim Miller of Rolling Stone wrote, "After a year and a half of Jim Morrison's posturing, one might logically hope for some sort of musical growth and if the new record isn't really terrible, it isn't particularly exciting either." Pete Johnson reviewing the record for The Philadelphia Inquirer, wrote a positive review, remarking that Waiting for the Sun contains "the smallest amount self-indulgent" songs compared to the Doors previous albums. The New Musical Express declared "The Unknown Soldier" as the standout of side one and "all on side two are gems, notably 'My Wild Love' and the long finale 'Five to One'."

In his retrospective review, Richie Unterberger of AllMusic wrote, "The Doors' 1967 albums had raised expectations so high that their third effort was greeted as a major disappointment. With a few exceptions, the material was much mellower and while this yielded some fine melodic ballad rock... there was no denying that the songwriting was not as impressive as it had been on the first two records." In his review of the 2007 reissue, Sal Cinquemani of Slant praised the album, writing that "Despite the fact that Morrison was becoming a self-destructing mess," Robby Krieger, Ray Manzarek and John Densmore were "never more lucidperhaps to compensate. This was a band at its most dexterous, creative and musically diverse." Classic Rock critic Max Bell overviewing the 50th Anniversary Deluxe Edition, gave Waiting for the Sun a positive rating of four out of five stars. Stereogum ranked it the third best Doors album behind L.A. Woman and The Doors, concluding: "This is the Doors at their strangest, their most exploratory, their most stylistically expansive. Waiting for the Sun has examples of everything the Doors did well, and it has them doing it at, occasionally, their highest level."

Track listing

Original album 
All tracks are written by the Doors individually (Jim Morrison, Ray Manzarek, Robby Krieger and John Densmore). Details are taken from the original 1968 Elektra Records release.

Reissues
40th Anniversary Edition

50th Anniversary Edition second CD bonus tracks

Personnel 
Details are taken from the 2019 Rhino Records reissue liner notes with accompanying essay by Bruce Botnick and may differ from other sources.

The Doors
 Jim Morrisonvocals
 Ray Manzarekkeyboards, piano on "Yes, the River Knows"
 Robby Kriegerguitar
 John Densmoredrums

Additional musicians
 Douglas Lubahnoccasional bass, electric bass on "Spanish Caravan"
 Kerry Magnessbass guitar on "The Unknown Soldier"
 Leroy Vinnegaracoustic bass on "Spanish Caravan"

Technical
 Paul A. Rothchildproduction
 Bruce Botnickengineering
 William S. Harveyart direction and design
 Paul Ferrarafront cover photograph
 Guy Websterback cover photography

Charts 
Album

Singles

Certifications

References

Sources

External links 
 

1968 albums
Elektra Records albums
The Doors albums
Albums produced by Paul A. Rothchild
Asylum Records albums